Below is a complete list of state visits made and received by Harald V of Norway. Four state visits are usually made each year: two visits by King Harald and Queen Sonja to a foreign head of state and two visits by another head of state to Norway. The number of state visits has increased greatly during the 1900s. King Haakon VII reigned for 52 years from 1905 and made a total of 13 state visits to foreign countries. King Harald V had  reigned for 25 years and had conducted 45 state visits. Today a state visit is accompanied by large trade delegations and is seen as an important venue to promote trade and other business relations as well as cultural and political ties between the two countries.

State visits made by Harald V

State visits received by Harald V

See also
List of state visits made by Haakon VII of Norway
List of state visits made by Olav V of Norway

Sources
 Royal House list of state visits

External links
Video from the Royal family's visit to the United Kingdom in 2005
Short video from the Portuguese state visit to Norway when the Crown Prince acted as regent

Harald V
Harald V